Tetrabamate (Atrium, G Tril, Sevrium) is a combination drug formulation of febarbamate, difebarbamate, and phenobarbital which was marketed in France and Spain and was used to treat anxiety and alcohol withdrawal-associated muscle tremors, agitation, and depression. It was largely, but not completely discontinued on April 4, 1997 after over 30 years of use due to reports of hepatitis and acute liver failure. The decision to restrict the use of the drug had been long-awaited.

References 

Anxiolytics
Barbiturates
Carbamates
Drug rehabilitation
Hepatotoxins
Muscle relaxants
Sedatives
Withdrawn drugs
Combination drugs
GABAA receptor positive allosteric modulators